; ;) is a market town, community and electoral ward in Blaenau Gwent, Wales. It grew with the development of the coal mining and iron industries in the early 19th century. Until the reorganisation of local authorities in 1974, Brynmawr was administered as part of the county of Brecknockshire.

Welsh language
According to the 2011 Census, 6.0% of the ward's 5,530 (332 residents) resident-population can speak, read, and write Welsh. This is above the county's figure of 5.5% of 67,348 (3,705 residents) who can speak, read, and write Welsh. The town had the only Welsh-medium primary school, Ysgol Gymraeg Brynmawr, in Blaenau Gwent with 310 pupils ranging from nursery to year 6 until 2010, when the school re-located to a brand new, purpose-built building in Blaina.

History
Prior to the Industrial Revolution and the founding of Brynmawr, a settlement called Gwaun Helygen (meaning 'marsh of the willows') sat on a small area of moorland on the border between the counties of Monmouthshire and Brecknockshire. The village consisted of only a few scattered farm houses, a slew of small tram roads that led to the surrounding coal deposits, a staging inn, and a turnpike road from Abergavenny to Merthyr Tydfil which crossed through the bleak upland plateau.

With the development of Nantyglo ironworks under Crawshay Bailey in the early 19th century, suitable housing was needed for the workers, and thus the area of upland home to Gwaun Helygen was chosen as an ideal area for a settlement. Houses began to spring up around the tram roads and the turnpike road, and the town began to rapidly grow. Although the settlement was not home to any heavy industry, and was for the most part a dormitory town, several above-ground ore deposits outside of town were worked on, and a few underground levels were eventually dug beneath Brynmawr.However, by as early as the 1870s, many of the resources that were once considered abundant had been exhausted, and the local industry began to decline. As the town's residents practically solely relied on the surrounding industries, many of them left the town in search of employment, and Brynmawr witnessed a sharp drop in population.

The town's market hall, now the Market Hall Cinema was built in 1894, and replaced the older town hall built in 1844.

By the time of the Great Depression, most of the town's insured population were unemployed, which attracted the attention of a group of Quakers, whose worked in the town to relieve unemployment culminated in the Brynmawr Experiment.

In 1952, Jim Forrester of Enfield Cables Ltd opened a factory in the town, which was eventually acquired by the Dunlop Rubber Company. Operating under the brand name of Dunlop Semtex Ltd, the factory produced flooring for the health and education sectors up until its closure in 1981. It was demolished in 2001, and now only the boiler house remains, albeit in a derelict state.

Population
Brynmawr had an estimated population of 5,568 in 2020. In 2011, 10% of the population were unemployed.

Commerce and local economy

The town centre's primary shopping areas are contained within Beaufort Street and on Market Square which is also the focal point of the town where many events are hosted. The former Market Hall is now a cinema and theatre presenting films and productions from the local amateur operatic society. The business community offers many traditional, family-orientated and independently run shops, such as Tutta Bella, Durbans Shoe repairs, Perfectday Bridal, Pebbles and Welch Designs and many more.
The Tabor Centre, situated in Davies Street, is a multi-purpose community venue with rooms available for hire.
Brynmawr is also home to many artisan food producers, such as the award-winning Miss Daisy's Kitchen, specialist vegan and gluten-free food producers Daddies Little Pickle, and the Little Dragon Pizza Van, who organise the annual Brynmawr Street Food Festival.

Places of interest
Parc Nant y Waun is a nature reserve incorporating  of grassland, mires and reservoirs which was officially opened in 2007. Home to many wildlife species, it includes a picnic area, an outdoor classroom, and an angling club.

Sport and leisure

Brynmawr RFC is the local rugby union club which is affiliated to the Newport Gwent Dragons.
Brynmawr has a 350-seat cinema (The Market Hall Cinema) which is the longest continually running cinema in Wales. The Market Hall opened in 1893 and has recently been renovated. From November 2016 and throughout early 2017, the Market Hall Cinema had been closed after Blaenau Gwent Council conducted a series of asbestos tests in the building. The Market Hall was successfully reopened by Hollywood star Michael Sheen on 12 July 2017.

Notable people include professional wrestlers Adrian Street and  Flash Morgan Webster, singer-songwriters Huw and Tony Williams and indie pop singer-songwriter Marina Diamandis, known professionally as MARINA. Wales and Great Britain Rugby League international Roy Francis, who scored 229 tries in 356 top-flight matches and went on to win three National League titles and the 1968 Challenge Cup as a coach of Hull FC and Leeds, was born in the town and played for Brynmawr RFC. T Rowley Jones, President Welsh Rugby Union, 1977/78.

See also

Notes

References

External links

 Brynmawr Town Council website
 History of Brynmawr, Wales 

Towns in Blaenau Gwent
Market towns in Wales
Wards of Blaenau Gwent